Naval Gunfire Support (NGFS) (also known as Naval Surface Fire Support (NSFS) or shore bombardment) is the use of naval artillery to provide fire support for amphibious assault and other troops operating within their range.  NGFS is one of a number of disciplines encompassed by the term naval fires. Modern naval gunfire support is one of the three main components of amphibious warfare assault operations support, along with aircraft and ship-launched land-attack missiles.  Shipborne guns have been used against shore defences since medieval naval warfare.

Tactics 
NGFS is classified into two types: direct fire, where the ship has line of sight with the target (either visually or through the use of radar), and indirect fire, which, to be accurate, requires an artillery observer to adjust fire.

When on the gun line, ships are particularly vulnerable to attack from aircraft coming from a landward direction and flying low to avoid radar detection, or from submarines due to a predictable and steady (non-evasive) course.

History

Early history
An early use of shore bombardment was during the Siege of Calais in 1347 when Edward III of England deployed ships carrying bombards and other artillery.

An early type of vessel designed for the purpose of shore bombardment was the bomb vessel, which came into use during the 17th century. The burning of Falmouth by the Royal Navy was among the grievances of the United States Declaration of Independence. These were small ships whose main armament was one or two large mortars, that fired explosive shells at a high angle. They were typically poor sailing craft that were of limited use outside their specialized role. However, small vessels armed with large mortars saw use as late as the American Civil War, when the Union Navy used them in several attacks on coastal fortifications.

During the 18th century, another special class of vessel known as floating battery were devised for shore bombardment. An early use of them was by the French and Spanish during the Great Siege of Gibraltar (1779–1782). These carried either naval long guns or carronades. Floating batteries were used by both the French and British during the Crimean War, and by both sides during the American Civil War.

World War I 

In World War I the principal practitioner of naval bombardment (the term used prior to World War II for what was later designated naval gunfire support – NGFS) was Britain's Royal Navy (RN); and the main theatres in which RN ships fired against targets ashore were the Aegean—Dardanelles/Gallipoli, and later the Salonika front—and along the Belgian coast. In the Aegean the enemy coastal defences (forts, shore-batteries etc.) were fairly unsophisticated; however, on the Gallipoli peninsula these still proved to be difficult targets for the navy's low angle firing guns. Here, the fortresses outline tended to blend into the hillside making identification difficult and the guns themselves presented small targets. Mobile howitzers on the plateau presented even greater problems, since these were higher still, and being completely shielded from view proved almost impervious to naval bombardment. For RN ships bombarding German targets along the Belgian Coast the situation was altogether different from the autumn of 1915 until the enemy withdrawal in October 1918.

For this role, the Royal Navy frequently made use of specially designed vessels known as monitors. They carried extremely heavy armament for their size, often a single turret from a decommissioned battleship. A broad beamed hull designed for stability, and a shallow draft to allow close approach to the shore however made them slow vessels that were unsuitable for naval combat. Two s were fitted with BL 18 inch Mk I naval guns, the largest guns ever used by the Royal Navy.

The Germans constructed an extensive, well-equipped and well-coordinated system of gun-batteries etc. to defend the coast—and especially the ports of Ostend and Zeebrugge. Those ports, and the canals linking them to Bruges, were of major importance to the U-boat campaign in the North Sea and English Channel—and for that reason were frequently bombarded by RN monitors operating from Dover and Dunkirk.

The RN continually advanced their technology and techniques necessary to conduct effective bombardments in the face of the German defenders—firstly refining spotting/correction by aircraft (following initial efforts during the Dardanelles/Gallipoli campaign), then experimenting with night-bombardment and moving on to adopt Indirect Fire (in which a ship can accurately engage an unseen target, which may be several miles inland) as the norm for day- and night-firings.

Finally, in the summer of 1918, monitors were equipped with Gyro Director Training (GDT) gear—which effectively provided the Director with a gyro-stabilised Artificial Line of Sight, and thereby enabled a ship to carry out Indirect Bombardment while underway. This was a very significant advance, which basically established a firm foundation for naval bombardment as practiced by the RN and USN during the Second World War.

Between 1919–39 all RN battleships/battlecruisers and all new-construction cruisers were equipped with Admiralty Fire Control Tables and GDT gear, and from the early 1930s (probably earlier) were required to carry out "live" bombardment practice once in each commission. In 1939, therefore, the RN was quite well prepared for this particular aspect of joint warfare.

World War II 
The practice reached its zenith during World War II, when the availability of man-portable radio systems and sophisticated relay networks allowed forward observers to transmit targeting information and provide almost instant accuracy reports—once troops had landed. Battleships, cruisers (including Bobtail cruisers, designed to support amphibious operations), and destroyers would pound shore installations, sometimes for days, in the hope of reducing fortifications and attriting defending forces. Obsolete battleships unfit for combat against other ships were often used as floating gun platforms expressly for this purpose. However, given the relatively primitive nature of the fire control computers and radar of the era combined with the high velocity of naval gunfire, accuracy depended upon designated observer aircraft until troops landed and were able to radio back reports to the ship. Observation seaplanes proved vulnerable to land-based fighter aircraft during the invasion of Sicily so gunfire observers flew Spitfires in support of the Normandy landings.

The solution was to engage in longer bombardment periods—up to two weeks, in some cases—saturating target areas with fire until a lucky few shells had destroyed the intended targets. This alerted an enemy that he was about to be attacked. In the Pacific War this mattered less, where the isolated defenders of island strongholds expected to be invaded at some point and had already committed whatever combat resources were available. The Japanese used battleships only once for shore bombardment, when two battleships bombarded United States Marines at Guadalcanal's Henderson airfield in October 1942, inflicting minor damage. Bombardment periods were usually shorter in the European theatre, where surprise was more often valued, overland reinforcement far more likely, and ships' guns were responding to the movements of mobile defenders, not whittling away at static fortifications.

After the light cruiser  demonstrated the effectiveness of naval gunfire against tanks at Gela, the heavy-calibre guns of some eighteen battleships and cruisers were used to stop German Panzer counterattacks at Salerno. Naval gunfire was used extensively throughout Normandy, although initially the surprise nature of the landings themselves precluded a drawn-out bombardment which could have reduced the Atlantic Wall defences sufficiently, a process that fell to specialist armoured vehicles instead.

Post-war 

Naval gunfire support played a critical role in the Korean War; the conflict was ideal for this type of service, with much of the fighting taking place along the coast of the Korean Peninsula. The battleship  and light cruiser  provided heavy support, along with numerous light cruisers and destroyers. In particular were so-called "Trainbuster" patrols, working with spotter aircraft to destroy North Korean supply trains, as well as railway bridges and tunnels.

In the 1961 Indian annexation of Goa naval gunfire support was provided by the Indian Navy's cruisers, destroyers and frigates in support of Indian Army Operations.

During the Vietnam War, Task Unit 70.8.9, the US Naval Gunfire Support Unit, was made up of destroyers, armed with 5"/38 or 5"/54 guns, and continuously patrolled the coast of South Vietnam to provide NGFS at short notice. If greater firepower was required then larger gunned cruisers were called in for reinforcements, along with the battleship USS New Jersey for a single tour of duty. NGFS was controlled by the United States Marines Corps First Air-Naval Gunfire Liaison Company (ANGLICO) who provided spotters, usually airborne in light aircraft but sometimes on foot, in all military regions.

In the 1982 Falklands War, the British used NGFS in support of the advance of the British Army and Royal Marines.

In the 1983 actions in Lebanon, fire support was provided on several occasions by destroyers, cruisers, and New Jersey assigned to coastal patrol. They supported the US Marines as well as the Lebanese Army.

In 1991, during Operation Desert Storm the battleships  and  fired Tomahawk cruise missiles along with their main battery guns against Iraqi targets in the Euphrates Delta. This was the last firing of battleship guns during war, as well as the first use of drone aircraft to observe targets and give targeting corrections

In the 2003 Invasion of Iraq, NGFS was used in support of operations on the Al-Faw Peninsula in the early stages of the war by Royal Navy and Royal Australian Navy frigates.

During operation Unified Protector in 2011 in Libya, allied forces provided gun naval support to rebel forces.

On 1 June 2007, the American destroyer  shelled jihadist positions at Bargal, Somalia during Operation Enduring Freedom - Horn of Africa.

During the Battle of Sirte in the Second Libyan Civil War, the destroyer USS Carney conducted shore bombardments of ISIS positions as part of Operation Odyssey Lightning.

United States
Naval gunfire is still used for many of its traditional purposes.  In the United States Marine Corps, artillery units have several Naval Gunfire Liaison Officers (NGLO, pronounced "no-glow") in each battalion to maintain close contact with the Navy for amphibious operations.  The NGLO is responsible for the Shore Fire Control Party and works in the Fire Control Center with other liaison officers to coordinate naval gunfire with close air support, mortars, and howitzers.  The NGLO joins the others in the planning of fire missions in support of the Marine Infantry Regiment.

Additionally, the United States Marine Corps maintains three active (1st, 2nd, & 5th) and three reserve (3rd, 4th & 6th) ANGLICO units. ANGLICO members are temporarily assigned to combat units of the United States and foreign nations that lack inherent fire support capability, such as naval gunfire. The ships equipped with the large caliber guns of the early and middle of the 20th century have all been decommissioned. The aircraft carrier and sea to land missile have been used instead. The remaining naval artillery typically has more advanced targeting systems than the older large-caliber artillery.

Within the U.S. there was a long debate over the role naval gunfire support should play in warfare. This took on a greater sense of urgency with the removal of the last two battleships from the NVR.

Continued naval gunfire support training
Despite the reduction in calibre size to  guns, even ground-based NATO forces' artillery observers (FOs) and Forward Air Controllers (FACs)  are taught the rudiments of calling in and adjusting naval gunfire. With the exception of a few procedures, the controlling principles are quite similar in both land and naval bombardment.  While the ground-based FO starts his adjustment mission by saying, "Adjust Fire", the naval gunfire spotter says, "Fire Mission"; from that point on the procedures are almost identical.

Shore Fire Control Parties participate in field operations, often with a Marine artillery battery to provide simulated naval gunfire support.  When available, Marine spotters will call the fire missions for naval ships undergoing their gunnery qualification tests, to provide both parties the opportunity to practice their skills.

One use of naval gunfire in modern operations is to provide Suppression of Enemy Air Defense (SEAD) for Close Air Support.  Well-timed salvos provide covering fire for sorties and prevent enemy troops and batteries from effectively using anti-aircraft weapons.

See also
 Air Naval Gunfire Liaison Company
 Field artillery team
 148 (Meiktila) Commando Forward Observation Battery Royal Artillery
 Donald M. Weller

References

Citations

Online sources 
 U.S Marine Corps: An Annotated Bibliography of Naval Gunfire Support

Further reading 

Naval artillery